Hughes River Wildlife Management Area is located in Wirt County and Ritchie County near Parkersburg, West Virginia.  Located on  that border both the Little Kanawha River and the Hughes River.  The WMA terrain varies from river bottom to steep hillsides covered with second growth oak-hickory hardwood stands and younger pine-hardwood woodlots.

The Hughes River WMA is located on both sides of the road at the Wirt/Ritchie county line.

Hunting and Fishing

Hunting opportunities include deer, grouse, squirrel, and turkey.

Fishing opportunities abound in both the Little Kanawha and Hughes Rivers, and can include smallmouth bass, channel catfish, muskellunge, and panfish (including bluegill.)

Camping is not permitted in the WMA.  Camping is available at nearby North Bend State Park.

See also

Animal conservation
Fishing
Hunting
List of West Virginia wildlife management areas

References

External links
West Virginia DNR District 6 Wildlife Management Areas
West Virginia Hunting Regulations
West Virginia Fishing Regulations
WVDNR map of Hughes River Wildlife Management Area

Wildlife management areas of West Virginia
Protected areas of Wirt County, West Virginia
Protected areas of Ritchie County, West Virginia
IUCN Category V